Karl Häseli (born 13 November 1948 in Zürich) is a Swiss bobsledder who competed in the mid-1970s. He won two bronze medals in the two-man event at the FIBT World Championships, earning them in 1974 and 1975.

Häseli also finished ninth in the four-man event at the 1976 Winter Olympics in Innsbruck.

References

External links
1976 bobsleigh four-man results
Bobsleigh two-man world championship medalists since 1931

1948 births
Living people
Bobsledders at the 1976 Winter Olympics
Swiss male bobsledders
Olympic bobsledders of Switzerland
20th-century Swiss people